The Church of the Holy Family is a Catholic Church located in Downtown Columbus, Georgia that was built in 1880.  The Catholic church in Columbus had outgrown its original church built in 1829.

The church's architect/builder, Daniel Matthew Foley, had designed 16 other churches before coming to Columbus to design this church.
It is the only Gothic Revival church in Columbus and "is an architectural as well as religious anchor point in the community."

It was added to the National Register of Historic Places in 1980.

It was listed on the National Register along with other historic properties identified in a large survey.

References

See also
National Register of Historic Places listings in Muscogee County, Georgia

Gothic Revival church buildings in Georgia (U.S. state)
Roman Catholic churches completed in 1877
19th-century Roman Catholic church buildings in the United States
Roman Catholic churches in Georgia (U.S. state)
Churches in Columbus, Georgia
Churches on the National Register of Historic Places in Georgia (U.S. state)
National Register of Historic Places in Muscogee County, Georgia
1829 establishments in the United States